Christ Church is an active Anglican parish church in Pennington, Leigh, Greater Manchester, England. Christ Church serves the parish of Pennington in the Leigh Deanery and Salford Archdeaconry in the Diocese of Manchester.  It is a Grade II listed building.

History
The parish was taken out of the ancient ecclesiastical parish of Leigh against the wishes of the vicar of Leigh Parish Church James Irvine. Irvine was opposed by his patron, Lord Lilford and many of his congregation including James Pownall the silk manufacturer. The vicar of St Stephen's Church, Astley, James Hewlett helped raise funds. The site, south of the Leeds and Liverpool Canal, cost £500 (£ in 2014), the building, £3,800 (£ in 2014), the churchyard fence and church furniture cost a further £500 (£ in 2014).

Architecture
The church was designed in the Gothic Revival style by E. H. Shellard and built in 1854 in hammer-dressed sandstone with ashlar dressings and a slate roof. Nikolaus Pevsner described it as a "Big, rather lifeless, church."

Exterior
Built on a projecting plinth, the church has a six-bay nave and two-bay chancel separated by buttresses. Its east and west gables have raked parapets with finials. There is a south porch. The bays have three-light windows while the clerestory and chancel have two-light windows. The east window has five lights. The castellated three-stage west tower has diagonal buttresses topped by crocketed pinnacles and a west door.

Interior
The double-chamfered nave arcade is supported on octagonal columns with moulded capitals. The west gallery has an arcaded parapet and below it a partition, constructed of wood and glass in the mid-20th century, separates the west end from the nave.

See also
List of churches in Greater Manchester
Listed buildings in Leigh, Greater Manchester

References
Notes

Bibliography

Pennington
Pennington
Pennington
19th-century Church of England church buildings
Pennington
Buildings and structures in Leigh, Greater Manchester